Jean Charles Gabriel Virolleaud (2 July 1879 – 17 December 1968) was a French archaeologist, one of the excavators of Ugarit.

Virolleaud was the author of La légende du Christ (1908) and was an advocate of the Christ myth theory. He also wrote the books La Civilisation phénicienne (1933) and La Mythologie phénicienne (1938).

Publications

Premier supplément à la liste des signes cunéiformes de Brünnow (1903)
Études sur la divination chaldéenne (1904)
La légende du Christ (1908) 
L'Astrologie chaldéenne: le livre intitulé "Enuma (Anu ilu) Bel" (1908)
L'Astrologie chaldéenne: Supplement (1909)
La Civilisation phénicienne (1933)
La Mythologie phénicienne (1938)

References

Further reading

 Bibliography and overviews of his publications by several writers appeared in Syria: Revue d’art oriental et d’archéologie, 33 (1956).
 Dupont-Sommer, André, “Notice sur la vie et les travaux de M. Charles Virolleaud”, Comptes rendus de l'Académie des inscriptions et belles-lettres,  (1969).
ObituarIes by André Parrot, “Charles Virolleaud (1879-1968)”, Syria: Revue d’art oriental et d’archéologie, 46 (1969), pp. 390–391, and by Ernst Friedrich Weidner, "Charles Virolleaud (2. July 1879 bis 17. December 1968)", Archiv für Orientforschung, 24 (1973), pp. 245–246.

1879 births
1968 deaths
Christ myth theory proponents
People from Charente
French archaeologists
Academic staff of the École pratique des hautes études
Members of the Académie des Inscriptions et Belles-Lettres
Members of the Société Asiatique
Phoenician-punic archaeologists